Liane, Jungle Goddess (German Liane, das Mädchen aus dem Urwald) is a 1956 West German film directed by Eduard von Borsody. It was based on the 1956 novel Liane, das Mädchen aus dem Urwald by Anne Day-Helveg. The film attracted considerable attention due to Marion Michael appearing topless.

Plot

During a German expedition in Africa, Thoren (Hardy Krüger) is attacked and captured by the local natives called the Botos. Before they can kill him, the Botos then notice the arrival of a long-haired, topless wild woman (Marion Michael) wearing only three necklaces and a loincloth made of beads, shells, and some feathers. She communicates with the Botos to spare him and let him go. When Thoren leaves, the wild woman heads into her treehouse. Later that night, Thoren tells the others of his experience with her and is told by one of them to take him to where he saw her. The Botos are shown doing entertainment as she plays with her pet lion cub Simba.

The next day, the wild woman grabs onto a vine and swings over a lake before she lets go to drop into the lake and go swimming. When she is spotted by Thoren, she escapes into the jungle only to be later caught in a big game net by Kersten and Keller which is spotted by one of the tribesmen who alerts the other Botos. Later that night, Thoren arrives and has part of the net removed from the woman's head and feeds her a banana. When the Botos attack in retaliation, Thoren hooks up a tape to a loudspeaker which frightens off the Botos, as Dr. Jacqueline Goddard (Irène Galter) undoes the net and lets her rest. After the Botos escape, the wild woman gets up and is attacked by an expedition member, only for him to be beaten up by Thoren, who warns him to keep his hands off of her. Thoren carries her body back to the tent to let her rest. Thoren and Jacqueline then notice that one of necklaces around her neck has a good luck charm with an L engraved into it. Thoren then decides to bring it to Professor Danner to figure it out.

The next day, Jacqueline gives the wild woman a bath which she enjoys, cuts her unruly hair to shoulder length, and puts her in some new clothes. Thoren comes in and tells Jacqueline that the whole world is asking for information about the white girl that they found. Jacqueline says that her name is Kiyahi, but could not understand anything else that she said. Thoren and Jacqueline then teach her some of their language and states that she must have originally come from a good family before being taken in by the Botos.

Meanwhile, in Germany, shipping tycoon Theo Amelongen (Rudolf Forster) and his nephew Viktor (Reggie Nalder) look at the article about the wild woman that was found and Theo suspects that it might be his long-lost granddaughter Liane, who went missing 18 years ago when the ship she and her parents were on went down, with a speculation that her Liane at 2 years old had somehow survived. Theo decides to have his agents look into this.

Back in Africa, Thoren takes Liane with him and Jacqueline. When Liane's tribesman friend Tanga (Jean Pierre Faye) and Simba show up, he ends up sneaking on the ship. While Liane, Thoren, and Jacqueline are playing cards, Tanga catches up with them and they end up taking him and the lion cub with them. When the ship arrives in Germany, the press swarm over Liana until Thoren sends then off.

When the group ends up at Theo's house, he is reintroduced to Liane as well as being introduced to Tanga and Simba. Viktor is told by his lawyer that Liane will be inheriting the fortune. This causes Viktor to take matters into his old hands without Theo finding out. He ends up locking her into a room and ends up getting attacked by Tanga. At his company later, Viktor hires a man named Jensen who was one of the survivors of the ship Imperia sinking and asks to testify that he had no survivors without mentioning that Viktor hired him for this.

While talking with Thoren as a bikini-clad Liane plays with Simba, Theo tells Thoren that he will watch over Liane until he gets back. They then see Liane climb up a tree and dive into the lake that she swims in until breakfast is served. Theo then commented that she had inherited her mother's swimming abilities. Theo and Thoren then look at the last letter Liane's mother wrote, which says that she had given her milk to her fox terrier Terry and enjoys climbing. Later on, Blackie the dog finds a piece of paper of the letter that was crumpled up. When Thoren asks who would want to try to dispose of the letter, Theo asks his maid where Viktor is. Theo then arranges to meet with Viktor tonight. When the counselor arrives with Viktor, they find Theo dead in his study. Moments later, the police are called in where the counselor and the maid are questioned about Theo's death. They found the evidence of the pencil and string, which the inspector thinks that the culprit would end up getting into the study. It is then discovered that Viktor was responsible for his uncle's death as he makes his escape. Viktor then gets into his car as Thoren and the police pursue him. The car chase goes down the street until Viktor ends up driving off the bridge to his death.

Back in Africa, Professor Danner gets the news that Liane has inherited the Amelongen fortune and gets a news article that Liane is heading back to Africa to visit the Danner expedition. Professor Danner considers this as a homecoming with Thoren and Tanga arriving with her. The Botos also rejoice with the news that Liane and Tanga are coming back. Liane, Tanga, and Thoren arrive with Professor Danner. While the Botos celebrate, Liane runs off into the jungle, gets naked, and goes swimming in a lake. She is then joined by Thoren.

Cast
 Marion Michael - Liane
 Hardy Krüger - Thoren
 Irène Galter - Dr. Jacqueline Goddard
 Peter Mosbacher - Tibor Teleky
 Rudolf Forster - Theo Amelongen
 Reggie Nalder - Viktor
 Rolf von Nauckhoff - Professor Danner
 Edward Tierney - Kersten
 Reinhard Kolldehoff - Keller
 Herbert Hübner - Justizrat Warmuth
 Olga von Togni - Alma
 Jean Pierre Faye - Tanga
 Arno Paulsen - Kriminalkommissar
 Anneliese Würtz - Frieda the Maid
 Editha Horn - Miss Helumund
 Waltraut Runze - Ellen the Upstairs Maid
 Walter Bluhm - Port Said Rep
 Curt Lucas - Ship's Captain
 Hans Emons - Nedrick
 Erik Radolf - Jensen

Sequel
There was a sequel called , a.k.a. Nature Girl and the Slaver (1957) where Marion Michael reprises her role of Liane. Set in North Africa, this story concerns Arab slave traders who abduct Liane and members of her tribe. Third film Liane, die Tochter des Dschungels was released in 1961 that was a compilation of the first two films.

External links 
 
 
 Liane, Jungle Goddess at The Vault of Bunchness

1956 films
1956 adventure films
German adventure films
West German films
1950s German-language films
Jungle girls
Films set in Africa
Films shot in Africa
Films based on German novels
Films with screenplays by Ernst von Salomon
1950s German films